Aspidostomatidae is a family of bryozoans belonging to the order Cheilostomatida.

Genera

Genera:
 Aspidostoma Hincks, 1881
 Crateropora Levinsen, 1909
 Entomaria Duvergier, 1921

References

Bryozoan families